= National Higher School of Information and Communication Technologies =

Public research institution in Chad

- École nationale supérieure des technologies de l’Information et de la communication (ENASTIC)
- Type: Public
- Established: 2 March 2015; 11 years ago
- Location: N’Djamena, Chad

The National Higher School of Information and Communication Technologies (ENASTIC) is a public institution for education, research, innovation, and higher training in the fields of electronic communications. It was established by ordinance number 005/PR/2015 on 2 March 2015 and has legal personality and financial autonomy. ENASTIC is administered by a board of directors, led by a general director, and falls under the supervision of the Ministry of Posts and New Information Technologies. The Ministry of Higher Education, Research, and Innovation oversees the academic and pedagogical organization.

== Location ==
Its headquarters is in N'Djamena, the capital of Chad.

== Training ==
- Train professionals from public and private sectors in the field of information and communication technologies.
- Research and develop communication means in place in Chad to improve the country's socio-economic development.
- Train young people in scientific culture to make them capable of leading, developing, and carrying out future structuring projects based on Information and Communication Technologies (ICT).

== Mission ==
1. Ensure initial and continuous training in the fields of ICT;
2. Undertake applied research of general interest to promote innovation for socio-economic development;
3. Develop scientific and technological research as well as the valorization of results and the dissemination of scientific culture and information.
